Richards' theorem is a mathematical result due to Paul I. Richards in 1947.  The theorem states that for,

The theorem has applications in electrical network synthesis.  The PRF property of an impedance function determines whether or not a passive network can be realised having that impedance.  Richards' theorem led to a new method of realising such networks in the 1940s.

Proof 

where,

Since  is PRF then

is also PRF. Since a PRF can have no zeroes in the right-half s-plane, then  can have no poles in the right-half s-plane and hence is analytic in the right-half s-plane.

Let

Since the PRF condition requires that  for all  then  for all . The maximum magnitude of  occurs on the  axis because  is analytic in the right-half s-plane.

Richards' theorem can also be derived  from Schwarz's lemma.

Uses 
The theorem was introduced by Paul I. Richards as part of his investigation into the properties of PRFs.  The term PRF was coined by Otto Brune who proved that the PRF property was a necessary and sufficient condition for a function to be realisable as a passive electrical network, an important result in network synthesis.  Richards gave the theorem in his 1947 paper in the reduced form,

that is, the special case where 

The theorem (with the more general casse of  being able to take on any value) formed the basis of the network synthesis technique presented by Raoul Bott and Richard Duffin in 1949. Making  the subject gives

The whole process can then be applied iteratively to  until the degree of the function is reduced to something that can be realised directly.

The advantage of the Bott-Duffin synthesis is that, unlike other methods, it is able to synthesise any PRF.  Other methods have limitations such as only being able to deal with two kinds of element in any single network.  Its major disadvantage is that it does not result in the minimal number of elements in a network.  The number of elements grows exponentially with each iteration.  After the first iteration there are two  and associated elements, after the second, there are four  and so on.

Hubbard notes that Bott and Duffin appeared not to know the relationship of Richards' theorem to Schwarz's lemma and offers it as his own discovery, but it was certainly known to Richards who used it in his own proof of the theorem.

References

Bibliography 
 Bott, Raoul; Duffin, Richard, "Impedance synthesis without use of transformers", Journal of Applied Physics, vol. 20, iss. 8, p. 816, August 1949.
 Cauer, Emil; Mathis, Wolfgang; Pauli, Rainer, "Life and Work of Wilhelm Cauer (1900 – 1945)", Proceedings of the Fourteenth International Symposium of Mathematical Theory of Networks and Systems (MTNS2000), Perpignan, June, 2000.
 Hubbard, John H., "The Bott-Duffin synthesis of electrical circuits", pp. 33–40 in, Kotiuga, P. Robert (ed), A Celebration of the Mathematical Legacy of Raoul Bott, American Mathematical Society, 2010 .
 Hughes, Timothy H.; Morelli, Alessandro; Smith, Malcolm C., "Electrical network synthesis: A survey of recent work", pp. 281–293 in, Tempo, R.; Yurkovich, S.; Misra, P. (eds), Emerging Applications of Control and Systems Theory, Springer, 2018 .
 Richards, Paul I., "A special class of functions with positive real part in a half-plane", Duke Mathematical Journal, vol. 14, no. 3, 777–786, 1947.
 Wing, Omar, Classical Circuit Theory, Springer, 2008 .

Theorems in complex analysis
Electronic engineering
Network synthesis
Circuit theorems